Offenders is a 2017 Serbian drama film directed by Dejan Zečević. It was selected as the Serbian entry for the Best Foreign Language Film at the 91st Academy Awards, but it was not nominated.

Cast
 Radovan Vujović as Aleksandar
 Mladen Sovilj as Danijel
 Marta Bjelica as Teodora
 Svetozar Cvetković as Professor Slavko Zurovac

See also
 List of submissions to the 91st Academy Awards for Best Foreign Language Film
 List of Serbian submissions for the Academy Award for Best Foreign Language Film

References

External links
 

2017 films
2017 drama films
Serbian drama films
2010s Serbian-language films
Films set in Belgrade
Films shot in Belgrade